Prior to closure, the Wichita Falls Railroad Museum was a railroad museum in Wichita Falls, Texas.  It was founded in 1980 to establish a museum of railroad, streetcar, and pioneer history.   Starting its existence in the town's historic Depot Square, it changed locations over time, but had since 1992 been located back in Depot Square.

Rolling stock included the Fort Worth and Denver Railway No. 304 steam locomotive, and the Missouri–Kansas–Texas Railroad ("Katy") diesel switcher 1029, as well as Commuter Cars, Pullman Troop Sleepers, Dining Cars, Post Office and Baggage Cars, Cabooses and more.

The museum closed in March 2020 because of the COVID-19 pandemic.  Museum officials originally agreed with the City of Wichita Falls, which owned the museum building, to terminate the lease and, by the end of 2021, ship the contents to the Museum of North Texas History, also in Wichita Falls.  However, by May of 2022, no final plan regarding what to do with the artifacts had been approved by the City of Wichita Falls, and the artifacts remained behind locked gates in their old location.

Gallery

See also
List of heritage railroads in the United States

External links
 Facebook Page of the Wichita Falls Railroad Museum
 Museum of North Texas History

References

Railroad museums in Texas
Museums in Wichita County, Texas
Buildings and structures in Wichita Falls, Texas